V. Ramasubramanian (born 30 June 1958) is a judge of Supreme Court of India. He is former chief justice of Himachal Pradesh High Court. He is also former judge of Madras High Court and Telangana High Court.

References 

1958 births
Living people
Chief Justices of the Himachal Pradesh High Courtv
Judges of the Madras High Court
Judges of the Telangana High Court
Justices of the Supreme Court of India
People from Chennai
21st-century Indian judges